Domène is a commune in the Isère department in southeastern France. It is part of the Grenoble urban unit (agglomeration).

Population

Twin towns
Domène is twinned with:

  Vedano al Lambro, Italy
  Mühlhausen-Ehingen, Germany

See also
Communes of the Isère department

References

External links

Official site

Communes of Isère
Isère communes articles needing translation from French Wikipedia